Senijad Ibričić (born 26 September 1985) is a former Bosnian professional footballer who played as an attacking midfielder. Besides Bosnia and Herzegovina, he played in Croatia, Russia, Turkey, Macedonia, Iran, and Slovenia.

He represented the Bosnia and Herzegovina national team for nine years, making 44 appearances and scoring 4 goals. Ibričić holds both Bosnian and Croatian citizenship.

Club career

Zagreb
After one season at senior level in Bosnia and Herzegovina, Ibričić left to play for Croatian side NK Zagreb. He established himself as one of the club's best players, and soon attracted interest from bigger clubs in Croatia. He was transferred to Hajduk in 2008 for €1.8 million.

Hajduk Split
In April 2010 Ibričić scored against Dinamo Zagreb, Hajduk's biggest rivals, for the second time in his career. The goal sent Hajduk to the final of the Croatian Cup with a narrow 1–0 aggregate scoreline. He scored again in both the legs of the final and thereby won his first trophy for the club. He finished the 2009–10 season with 17 goals, only behind Davor Vugrinec in the Prva HNL. He was voted the best player in the Croatian League and received the Sportske novosti Yellow Shirt award for the 2009–10 season. This was the first time since 1992 that a Hajduk Split player got the prestigious award. He also won the 2009–10 fans' player of the year award, the Heart of Hajduk.

In late August 2010 he was linked with a possible move to Turkish side Galatasaray. According to media reports, Gaziantepspor offered €6.5 million to Hajduk, but the offer was turned down, with former Hajduk president Joško Svaguša saying that the minimum transfer fee for Ibričić would be in the region of €10 million.

Lokomotiv Moscow
On 13 January 2011, he was transferred to Russian club FC Lokomotiv Moscow for a reported fee of around €7 million. Hajduk will also receive 20% of Ibričić's next transfer sum. He scored his first goal for Lokomotiv from the penalty spot in a league match against FC Krasnodar.

Gaziantepspor
On 31 July 2012, Ibričić moved on loan to Gaziantepspor. He scored twice in 13 Süper Lig games for this team.

Kasımpaşa
On 4 January 2013, Ibričić moved on loan to Kasımpaşa S.K.

Kayseri Erciyesspor
On 26 August 2013, Ibričić signed a three-year contract with Kayseri Erciyesspor.

Vardar
On 9 February 2015, Ibričić has moved to the Macedonian side Vardar. Later, on 15 March he was scored first goal from penalty, in his third game in the club against Turnovo.

Sepahan
Ibričić joined Persian Gulf League side Sepahan in January 2016. He made his debut in a 2–2 draw against Persepolis.

Koper
Ibričić joined Koper in Slovenia on 16 June 2016, signing a two-year contract.

International career
Ibričić established himself in the national team of Bosnia and Herzegovina when his former coach at NK Zagreb, Miroslav Blažević became the national team's manager. He made his debut for Bosnia and Herzegovina in a February 2005 friendly match away against Iran and has earned a total of 44 caps, scoring four goals. He participated in each of Bosnia's 12 games in their 2010 FIFA World Cup qualifying campaign (ten in the regular qualification, and two playoff games). He scored his first goal for the national team in a friendly against Bulgaria. He also scored against Estonia in a record-breaking 7–0 victory in Zenica. His final international was a June 2014 pre-World Cup tournament friendly against Mexico. As of 21 July 2014, Ibričić has retired from international football for Bosnia and Herzegovina.

International goals
Scores and results list Bosnia and Herzegovina's goal tally first, score column indicates score after each Ibričić goal.

Honours
Hajduk Split
Croatian Cup: 2009–10

Vardar
Macedonian First League: 2014–15

References

External links

1985 births
Living people
People from Kotor Varoš
Bosniaks of Bosnia and Herzegovina
Association football midfielders
Bosnia and Herzegovina footballers
Bosnia and Herzegovina under-21 international footballers
Bosnia and Herzegovina international footballers
2014 FIFA World Cup players
NK Zagreb players
HNK Hajduk Split players
FC Lokomotiv Moscow players
Gaziantepspor footballers
Kasımpaşa S.K. footballers
Kayseri Erciyesspor footballers
FK Vardar players
Karşıyaka S.K. footballers
Sepahan S.C. footballers
FC Koper players
NK Domžale players
First League of the Federation of Bosnia and Herzegovina players
Croatian Football League players
Russian Premier League players
Süper Lig players
Macedonian First Football League players
TFF First League players
Persian Gulf Pro League players
Slovenian PrvaLiga players
Bosnia and Herzegovina expatriate footballers
Expatriate footballers in Croatia
Bosnia and Herzegovina expatriate sportspeople in Croatia
Expatriate footballers in Russia
Bosnia and Herzegovina expatriate sportspeople in Russia
Expatriate footballers in Turkey
Bosnia and Herzegovina expatriate sportspeople in Turkey
Expatriate footballers in North Macedonia
Bosnia and Herzegovina expatriate sportspeople in North Macedonia
Expatriate footballers in Iran
Bosnia and Herzegovina expatriate sportspeople in Iran
Expatriate footballers in Slovenia
Bosnia and Herzegovina expatriate sportspeople in Slovenia